Elections to Dungannon and South Tyrone Borough Council were held on 7 June 2001 on the same day as the other Northern Irish local government elections. The election used four district electoral areas to elect a total of 22 councillors.

Election results

Note: "Votes" are the first preference votes.

Districts summary

|- class="unsortable" align="centre"
!rowspan=2 align="left"|Ward
! % 
!Cllrs
! % 
!Cllrs
! %
!Cllrs
! %
!Cllrs
! % 
!Cllrs
!rowspan=2|TotalCllrs
|- class="unsortable" align="center"
!colspan=2 bgcolor="" | Sinn Féin
!colspan=2 bgcolor="" | UUP
!colspan=2 bgcolor="" | SDLP
!colspan=2 bgcolor="" | DUP
!colspan=2 bgcolor="white"| Others
|-
|align="left"|Blackwater
|22.6
|1
|bgcolor="40BFF5"|33.6
|bgcolor="40BFF5"|2
|14.2
|1
|29.6
|1
|0.0
|0
|5
|-
|align="left"|Clogher Valley
|bgcolor="#008800"|30.2
|bgcolor="#008800"|2
|25.1
|1
|23.0
|1
|21.7
|1
|0.0
|0
|5
|-
|align="left"|Dungannon Town
|bgcolor="#008800"|30.3
|bgcolor="#008800"|2
|24.7
|2
|17.3
|1
|19.2
|1
|8.5
|0
|6
|-
|align="left"|Torrent
|bgcolor="#008800"|55.5
|bgcolor="#008800"|3
|10.9
|1
|15.2
|1
|3.6
|0
|14.8
|1
|6
|- class="unsortable" class="sortbottom" style="background:#C9C9C9"
|align="left"| Total
|36.0
|8
|22.8
|6
|17.2
|4
|17.6
|3
|6.4
|1
|22
|-
|}

District results

Blackwater

1997: 3 x UUP, 1 x DUP, 1 x SDLP
2001: 2 x UUP, 1 x DUP, 1 x SDLP, 1 x Sinn Féin
1997-2001 Change: Sinn Féin gain from UUP

Clogher Valley

1997: 2 x UUP, 1 x Sinn Féin, 1 x SDLP, 1 x DUP
2001: 2 x Sinn Féin, 1 x UUP, 1 x SDLP, 1 x DUP
1997-2001 Change: Sinn Féin gain from UUP

Dungannon Town

1997: 2 x UUP, 1 x Sinn Féin, 1 x DUP, 1 x SDLP, 1 x Democratic Left
2001: 2 x UUP, 2 x Sinn Féin, 1 x DUP, 1 x SDLP
1997-2001 Change: Sinn Féin gain from Democratic Left

Torrent

1997: 3 x Sinn Féin, 1 x SDLP, 1 x UUP, 1 x Independent Nationalist
2001: 3 x Sinn Féin, 1 x SDLP, 1 x UUP, 1 x Independent
1997-2001 Change: Independent Nationalist becomes Independent

References

Dungannon and South Tyrone Borough Council elections
Dungannon and South Tyrone